This is a listing of the horses that finished in either first, second, or third place and the number of starters in the Allaire duPont Distaff Stakes, a grade 3 American Thoroughbred horse race run at 1-1/16 miles over dirt at Pimlico Race Course, in Baltimore, Maryland.

References 

Pimlico Race Course